Bugisu sub-region is a region in Eastern Uganda that consists of the following districts:

 Bududa District
 Bulambuli District 
 Manafwa District 
 Mbale District
 Namisindwa District
 Sironko District

The sub-region is home mainly to the Gisu people, also called Bagisu, (singular is Mugisu). The Bagisu speak Lugisu, a dialect of Lumasaba, a Bantu language. Lugisu is very similar to the Bukusu language spoken of the Bukusu people of Kenya.

According to the 2002 national census, the Bugisu sub-region was home to an estimated 1 million people at that time.

See also
 Regions of Uganda
 Districts of Uganda

References

 
Sub-regions of Uganda
Eastern Region, Uganda